The China Strait is a navigable strait in the Milne Bay Province of Papua New Guinea between mainland New Guinea and Samarai Island.

References

External links
 ITouch Map of the China Strait

Straits of Papua New Guinea